"Can't Hold Us" is a song written and performed by American hip hop duo Macklemore & Ryan Lewis featuring American singer Ray Dalton, originally released on August 16, 2011, as the second single from the duo's debut album The Heist (2012).

The song was a sleeper hit, gaining more attention in 2012 and 2013. In May 2013, it reached number one on the Billboard Hot 100, making it their second number-one hit in the United States. It is also their third consecutive number-one single in Australia. The music video was nominated for Best Music Video at the 56th Annual Grammy Awards in 2014. The song was also listed as "The Most-Streamed Song of 2013" by Spotify.

Critical reception
"Can't Hold Us" received critical acclaim. Lewis Corner of Digital Spy gave the song four stars out of five, praising its "infectious, soul-soaked piano line and beats more vibrant than Rio de Janeiro's finest carnival floats". Writing for The Edge, Hannah Mylrea rated the song 9/10 and complimented the duo's dynamism, deeming it "another massive summer hit". AllMusic's David Jeffries also gave it four stars on five and wrote: "Macklemore & Ryan Lewis combine the handclapping, foot-stomping, and propulsive rhythms of old-fashioned gospel music with an infectious, uplifting chorus that could have been ripped straight out of will.i.am's playbook...this motivational, "this is the moment" number is identifiably and lovably Macklemore."

Commercial performance
Due to the major international success of the duo's "Thrift Shop", there was a resurgence in sales of their previous singles and their album The Heist.

In the United Kingdom, the song debuted in the UK Singles Chart at number 187 on March 17, 2013, climbing up to number 53 the following week. It eventually peaked at number three on the chart. In Australia, "Can't Hold Us" became Macklemore & Ryan Lewis' third consecutive number-one single after "Thrift Shop" and "Same Love", reaching the top of the chart on March 25, 2013. In the United States, the song became a sleeper hit, and following a performance of the song on Saturday Night Live, the song cracked the top 10 at number 7, becoming the duo's second top 10 hit, following the number-one single "Thrift Shop". "Can't Hold Us" reached number one on the Billboard Hot 100 during the chart issue May 18, 2013. They became the first duo to place their two debut singles atop the chart. They also became the fifth act to place their two debut singles atop the Billboard Hot 100, following Mariah Carey with "Vision of Love" and "Love Takes Time", Christina Aguilera with "Genie in a Bottle" and "What a Girl Wants", Lady Gaga with "Just Dance" and "Poker Face" and Bruno Mars with "Just the Way You Are" and "Grenade". The song stayed at number one for five consecutive weeks before being surpassed by Robin Thicke's "Blurred Lines". As of January 2014, the song has sold 4,383,000 downloads in the United States with 4,260,000 sold in 2013, making it the eighth best-selling song of the year.

Music video
Macklemore premiered the music video for "Can't Hold Us" on April 17, 2013. The video was directed by Ryan Lewis, Jason Koenig and Jon Jon Augustavo, and shooting took place for 17 days, on 2 continents and 16 different shoots, ranging from the Pacific Northwest to Southern California to New Zealand at Cathedral Cove where scenes for The Chronicles of Narnia: Prince Caspian were also shot. Several prominent parts were filmed on the tall ship Lady Washington.

The video won two MTV Video Music Awards for Best Hip-Hop Video and Director of Photography Jason Koenig, and Mego Lin won Best Cinematography, the video was nominated for Best Direction and Best Editing Nomination to Jason Koenig and Ryan Lewis. It also was placed at No. 12 on BET Notarized Top 100 in 2013. It was nominated for Best Music Video at the 2014 Grammy Awards.

Usage in the media
In May 2012, the song was re-released and featured in an International TV commercial for Miller Genuine Draft, created by the advertising agency me&lewis ideas. In early 2013, the song was used in a U.S. television commercial for Microsoft's Outlook.com webmail service. The song was also used in the background of ESPN College GameDay commercials, the March 2013 premiere episode of MTV's The Real World: Portland, in commercials for the movie R.I.P.D. and in the trailer for the film Grudge Match. It is featured on the soundtrack for the 2013 film on Steve Jobs titled  Jobs and the American basketball video game NBA 2K14. The song is featured on the Ubisoft dance game Just Dance 2014 as downloadable content. On July 2, 2013, mash-up artist DJ Earworm released a summer mash-up, incorporating "Can't Hold Us" with 10 other songs that became popular in summer 2013. In late 2013, the chorus from the song was used in an ad campaign for the opening of the Graton Resort & Casino in Northern California. The song was also used in YouTube's Rewind video for 2013. The song's segment in the video featured YouTube personalities including The Slow Mo Guys, Smosh, KassemG, CorridorDigital, Jimmy Kimmel, Freddie Wong, and Macklemore himself accompanied by Grover from Sesame Street.

The song was also used in WWE Raws 2012 Slammy Awards for the Match of the Year nominations.

The song was used in a 2012 video by FaZeClan titled "FaZe ILLCAMS – Episode 37".

During the 2012 Seattle Seahawks season, the song became the official touchdown song for the team thanks to big fan coach Pete Carroll. Macklemore and Ryan Lewis, also big supporters of the Seahawks, performed "Can't Hold Us" along with "Thrift Shop" during the NFC Championship game halftime show at CenturyLink Field on January 19, 2014.

The song was used in the trailer of the 2013 film Jobs (film)

On March 17, 2014 Season 2 Episode 3 of the A&E TV show Bates Motel, "Can't Hold Us" was featured in a scene as music in the background.

On December 13, 2014 Season 11 player Fleur East sang the song at The X Factor final.

In 2014, the song was also used in the comedy film Horrible Bosses 2.

The song was also used in the third trailer of Ice Age: Collision Course.

The song was used in season 5, episode 12 of 90210, when Liam was fighting in the gym.

The song is also used in the 2016 film Middle School: The Worst Years of My Life.

The song was also used for Canada, Mexico and United States' Joint Bid for the 2026 FIFA World Cup.

The song is used as the theme song for the Brodozer monster truck on the Monster Jam circuit.

Macklemore himself performed the song with the Detroit Youth Choir on the season 14 finale of America's Got Talent (The Detroit Youth Choir also performed the song in the audition and the finals. This came after performing with the Ndlovu Youth Choir and Kygo performing his version of the Steve Winwood song "Higher Love" with posthumous vocals from Whitney Houston)

The song is used by the Seattle Mariners every time they score a home run at T-Mobile Park.

The New England Revolution use this song whenever Adam Buksa scores a goal at Gillette Stadium.

Track listing
 Digital download "Can't Hold Us" – 4:10
 "Can't Hold Us" (instrumental) – 4:10

 7-inch single "Can't Hold Us" – 4:10
 "Make the Money" – 3:45

 CD single (Germany)'
 "Can't Hold Us" – 4:10
 "Wings" – 3:45.

Charts

Weekly charts

Year-end charts

Decade-end charts

All-time charts

Certifications

Awards and nominations

Release history

References

2011 songs
2011 singles
Macklemore songs
Ryan Lewis songs
American hip hop songs
Number-one singles in Australia
Number-one singles in Sweden
Billboard Hot 100 number-one singles
Number-one singles in Poland
Oklahoma City Thunder
Songs written by Macklemore
Songs written by Ryan Lewis
Songs written by Ray Dalton
Elektra Records singles